Chunghwa TV, owned by CJ ENM E&M Division, is a Chinese television channel with Korean subtitles, also catering to the ethnic Chinese population. It broadcasts various programs such as Chinese lessons, music videos, news, dramas, etc. The company headquarters is located in Seoul, South Korea.

See also
 TVB Korea Channel

External links
 Official Site

CJ E&M channels
Mass media companies of South Korea
Television networks in South Korea
Television channels in South Korea
Television channels and stations established in 2004
Mass media in Seoul